Basil Abdul Nabi (born 28 August 1963) is a former professional  Kuwaiti footballer. He was a part of the mini revival of Kuwaiti football between 1975 and 1996. His part included winning two Gulf Cups.

References

1961 births
Living people
Kuwaiti footballers
Kuwait international footballers
Al Salmiya SC players
Association football forwards
Sportspeople from Kuwait City
Kuwait Premier League players